Meat chopper may refer to:
 Cleaver, a large meat knife
 M45 Quadmount, a World War II machine gun mounting
 Meatchopper coupling, a means of coupling railway cars